Malini Awasthi (born 11 February 1967) is an Indian folk singer. She sings in Bhojpuri, Awadhi and Hindi, She also presents Thumri and Kajri. The Government of India awarded her the civilian honour of the Padma Shri in 2016. She is known for her contribution in Bhojpuri music.

Early life
Malini Awasthi was born in Kannauj, Uttar Pradesh. She is a post graduate as well as gold medalist in Hindustani classical music from Bhatkhande University, Lucknow. Also, she achieved a gold medal in M.A. Modern History with specialization in Medieval and modern Indian architecture, University of Lucknow. She is a Ganda bandh student of Legendary Hindustani Classical Singer, Padma Vibhushan Vidushi Girija Devi of Banaras Gharana. She is married to senior IAS officer Awanish Kumar Awasthi (UP:1987) who retired as Principal Secretary to Government of Uttar Pradesh. They have a son Adwitiya and a daughter Ananya.

Career
Malini Awasthi is a regular performer at popular classical music festival, Jahan-e-Khusrau. She has a high pitch voice and is popular for rendition of Thumari, Thaare Raho Baanke Shyam.

She judged the Bhojpuri - Musical Reality Show "Sur Sangram" .

She participated on TV for NDTV Imagine's Junoon. She was appointed as the brand ambassador by Election Commission for UP Elections 2012 and 2014.

She sang the song "Sunder Susheel" in the 2015 film Dum Laga Ke Haisha which had music by Anu Malik.

Academic honors and Fellowships
Centenary Chair Professor for the Bharat Adhyan Kendra at the Banaras Hindu University

Cultural Performances

National
Thumri-Festival and Rag-rang-Festival, Taj-Mahotsav, Ganga- Mahotsav, Lucknow-Festival, Budh-Mahotsav, Ramayan-Mela, Kajri-Mela, Kabir-Utsav etc. in Uttar Pradesh.
 Shruti-Mandal-Samaroh, Kumbhal-Gardh-Festival, Teej- Festival-Jaipur in Rajasthan.
Surajkund-Craft-Mela and Heritage-Festival-Pinjore in Punjab and Hayana.

International
Pravasi Diwas at Trinidad, 2017
Festival of India in Mauritius, 2015
ICCR 40th, Anniversary celebration in Fiji, 2011
Independence Day celebration Houston, USA, 2004
Cultural Performance in Pakistan; 2007
Cultural Performance in South Bank center, London, 2011
Indian festival celebration in Netherlands: 2002, 2003, 2015 and 2016 
Vishwa Bhojpuri Sammelan, Mauritius; 2000, 2004, 2016
Cultural Concert in Philadelphia and Los Angeles; 2016

Filmography
 Jai Ho Chhath Maiya – Shailendra Singh, Malini Awasthi
 Bhole Shankar
 Bumm Bumm Bole
 Agent Vinod
 Dum Laga Ke Haisha
 Bhagan Ke Rekhan ki – Issaq (2013 film)
 Chaarfutiya Chhokare (2014 film)

Awards
 Padma Shri (2016)
Yash Bharti, UP Government 2006
Uttar Pradesh Sangeet Natak Academy Fellowship
 Sangeet Natak Academy

See Also
Neha Singh Rathore

References

External links
 Official site

Indian women folk singers
Indian folk singers
Living people
Singers from Lucknow
Recipients of the Padma Shri in arts
1967 births
Women musicians from Uttar Pradesh
20th-century Indian women singers
20th-century Indian singers
21st-century Indian women singers
21st-century Indian singers
Recipients of the Sangeet Natak Akademi Award